Hamden is an unincorporated community in Chariton County, in the U.S. state of Missouri.

History
A post office called Hamden was established in 1874, and remained in operation until 1953. The source of the name Hamden is obscure.

References

Unincorporated communities in Chariton County, Missouri
Unincorporated communities in Missouri